A space marine is a science fiction concept, an analogue for military marines in outer space.

Space Marine or Space Marines may also refer to:
Space Marine (Warhammer 40,000), a type of soldier in the Warhammer 40,000 universe
Warhammer 40,000: Space Marine, a 2011 video game based on the property
 Warhammer 40,000: Space Marine II an upcoming video game
Space Marine, one of several early versions of the miniatures game now known as Epic
 Space Marines (wargame), a miniatures wargame
 Space Marines (film), a 1996 film